The Walls of Jericho is a 1948 American drama film directed by John M. Stahl, written by Lamar Trotti, and starring Cornel Wilde, Linda Darnell, Anne Baxter, Kirk Douglas, Ann Dvorak, Colleen Townsend and Marjorie Rambeau. The picture was released by 20th Century Fox on August 4, 1948.

Plot
County attorney Dave Connors is stuck in an unhappy marriage to his wife Belle. He invites his friends, newly married Tucker and Algeria Wedge, to come and visit.

Algeria is secretly attracted to Dave and is frustrated that he doesn't return her feelings. When Dave decides to run for senator, Algeria encourages Tucker to run as well in an effort to make Tucker more like Dave.

Dave is reunited with an old friend, Julia Norman. She has been in love with Dave since childhood, and as they spend more time together, Dave begins to fall in love with her as well. They begin an affair, but they feel guilty over Dave's marriage to Belle. Julia decides to leave Jericho.

Marjorie Ransom, a mutual friend of Dave and Julia, runs away from home one night and accidentally kills a man who was harassing her. She goes to Julia for help, and she and Dave agree to help her. Algeria has learned of Julia and Dave's affair and uses this information to spoil the trial and ruin Dave's chances of being elected as senator. Algeria tells Belle of Dave's infidelity. Belle shoots Dave, leaving Julia to defend Marjorie in court. Julia uses the opportunity to defend herself and Dave's relationship as well as publicly question Algeria's own obsession with Dave. Marjorie is found not guilty. The film ends with Julia going to visit Dave in the hospital.

Cast  
 Cornel Wilde as Dave Connors
 Linda Darnell as Algeria Wedge
 Anne Baxter as Julia Norman
 Kirk Douglas as Tucker Wedge
 Ann Dvorak as Belle Connors
 Marjorie Rambeau as Mrs. Dunham
 Henry Hull as Jefferson Norman
 Colleen Townsend as Marjorie Ransome
 Barton MacLane as Gotch McCurdy
 Griff Barnett as Judge Hutto
 William Tracy as Cully Caxton
 Art Baker as Peddigrew
 Gene Nelson as Assistant Prosecutor, uncredited

References

External links 
 
 

1948 films
1948 drama films
American legal drama films
American political drama films
Films directed by John M. Stahl
20th Century Fox films
Films based on American novels
Adultery in films
Films set in the 1900s
Films set in Kansas
Films scored by Cyril J. Mockridge
1940s legal films
American black-and-white films
1940s English-language films
1940s American films